This is a list of notable Jewish Americans in the U.S. military. For other Jewish Americans, see Lists of Jewish Americans.

 Solomon Bush, soldier and signer of the non-importation agreement of October 1765 
 Martin Dannenberg, U.S. Army intelligence officer during World War II 
 Sergeant Sam Dreben, served in the United States Army in the Philippines, Panama Canal Zone, the Pancho Villa Expedition, and World War I, also fought in Honduras, Guatemala, Nicaragua, and the Mexican revolution; noted for his prowess with machine guns
 Kirk Douglas World War II {US Navy} 
 David Max Eichhorn (Jan. 6, 1906–July 16, 1986), Reform Jewish rabbi, author, and chaplain in the army who was among the troops that liberated Dachau; founded Merritt Island's Temple Israel
 Moses Jacob Ezekiel, Confederate Army soldier
 Jeffrey S. Feinstein, colonel, flying ace of the USAF in the Vietnam War 
 Jacob Frankel, first official Jewish chaplain in the US Armed Forces
 Joshua L. Goldberg, first rabbi to serve as a navy chaplain in WWII 
 Alexander D. Goode, was a rabbi and a lieutenant in the United States Army. He was one of the Four Chaplains who gave their lives to save other soldiers during the sinking of the troop transport Dorchester during World War II.
 Eric Greitens, Rhodes Scholar; United States Navy SEAL; served in the Iraq and Afghanistan Wars; humanitarian who founded The Mission Continues
 Sydney G. Gumpertz, Medal of Honor, World War One
 Jacob Hirschorn, Mexican War veteran  
Zach Iscol (born 1978), US Marine Corps veteran, entrepreneur, 2021 comptroller candidate for New York City
 Jack H. Jacobs, Medal of Honor recipient, Vietnam
 Leopold Karpeles (Civil War), sergeant, Medal of Honor recipient, Battle of the Wilderness, 1864
 Leon Klinghoffer, World War II Veteran  U.S. Army Air Corps
 Benjamin Levy (Civil War), private, Medal of Honor recipient,  Battle of Glendale, 1862 
 Uriah P. Levy (War of 1812), first Jewish commodore; first Jewish American to have a full U.S. Navy career (1812-1862); hero of the War of 1812; instrumental in ending the practice of flogging; bought, repaired, restored, and preserved Monticello (Jefferson's home) (1834-1862); namesake of the Jewish Chapel at the Norfolk Naval Base and the Jewish Chapel at the United States Naval Academy
 Robert Magnus, general, former assistant commandant of the Marine Corps
 David "Mickey" Marcus (World War II), Army lieutenant colonel, West Point graduate, divisional judge advocate, division commander; attended the "Big Five" meetings; volunteered to join D-Day airborne assault without formal training; received Distinguished Service Cross, Bronze Star, and British decorations; volunteered to Israeli Army to defend against Transjordan Arab Legion; became first Israeli brigadier general; served as commander of Jerusalem front
 Morris W. Morris, aka Lewis Morrison, first Black-Jewish commissioned officer in both the Confederate (1861) and Union (1861-1865) armies; served with the 2nd Louisiana Native Guard (Confederate) and also with the 2nd Louisiana Native Guard (U.S.) after its reorganization as a Union regiment
 Judah Nadich, Jewish chaplain and advisor on Jewish affairs on Gen Dwight D. Eisenhower's staff 
 Mark Polansky, NASA, USAF (Ret.), Space Shuttle commander
 Arnold Resnicoff, navy chaplain, special assistant (for Values and Vision) to the Secretary and Chief of Staff of the United States Air Force (Equivalent military rank: brigadier general)
 Hyman Rickover, United States Navy admiral, "Father of the Nuclear Navy"
 Jack L. Rives, lieutenant general, USAF, TJAG (The Judge Advocate General of the Air Force) 
 Maurice Rose, major general (World War II); negotiated the unconditional surrender of the Germans in Tunisia, Commanded 3rd Armored Division, the first division to cross the German border and the first to breach the Siegfried line; killed in combat
 Max Rose, U.S. Army infantry officer, veteran of the War in Afghanistan. Recipient of the Purple Heart for injuries sustained in the detonation of an improvised explosive device.
 Tibor Rubin (Korea), recipient of the Medal of Honor for actions in battle and in Chinese POW camp
 Brigadier General Edward S. Salomon (Civil War)
 Haym Salomon (American Revolution), Sons of Liberty, financier
 Francis Salvador (American Revolution), "Paul Revere of the South"
 Norton A. Schwartz, general, Chief of Staff of the Air Force
 Mordecai Sheftall, fought in the Revolutionary War and financier.
 George Stern (Civil War), enlisted in the U.S. Marine Corps as "Charles Stein" in June 1864 in Philadelphia, promoted to sergeant and later captured by the Confederates and imprisoned in Pensacola
 Michel Thomas (World War II), awarded Silver Star for service with 45th Infantry Division in 1944; CIC Agent, 1945–47
 Judah Touro (War of 1812), civilian volunteer in the American Army; philanthropist  
David L. Goldfein, General USAF, Chief of Staff of United States Air Force July 2016 – August 2020

See also
 List of Jewish Medal of Honor recipients
 Military history of Jewish Americans
 Jewish War Veterans of the United States of America

References

Notes

Military
Jewish Americans
Jews